Swing Kids may refer to:

 Swing Kids, an anti-Nazi swing movement in 1930s Germany
 Swing Kids (band), a San Diego hardcore punk band
 Swing Kids (1993 film), a Thomas Carter film about the swing movement in Germany
 Swing Kids (2018 film), a South Korean film
 Swing Kids (soundtrack), the soundtrack to the Thomas Carter film Swing Kids